Wageningen Academic Publishers is a publishing company in the field of life sciences that publishes scientific journals as well as monographs, textbooks, and proceedings. The company was founded in 2002 as successor of Wageningen Pers. The company publishes books in the fields of animal, food, social, plant, and environmental sciences.

Journals 
 Beneficial Microbes
 Comparative Exercise Physiology
Journal of Applied Animal Nutrition
 Journal of Insects as Food and Feed
 Journal on Chain and Network Science
 World Mycotoxin Journal

External links
 

Publishing companies established in 2002
Publishing companies of the Netherlands
Academic publishing companies
2002 establishments in the Netherlands